Henry Ephron (May 26, 1911 – September 6, 1992) was an American playwright, screenwriter and film producer who often worked with his wife, Phoebe (née Wolkind). He was active as a writer from the early 1940s through the early 1960s.

Early life
Henry Ephron was born in Bronx, New York, the son of Gittle "Gussie" (née Weinstein) and Yitzhak Asher "Isaac" Ephron, a retailer. His parents were Jewish immigrants, his father from Grodno, now in Belarus, and his mother from Skidzyel', now in Belarus. All four of his daughters by his first wife, Phoebe: Nora Ephron, Delia Ephron, Hallie Ephron and Amy Ephron, also became notable writers. Coincidentally, his second wife, June (née Gilmartin; July 6, 1911 – November 13, 1996), widow of Oscar Levant, who wed Ephron in 1978, was also one of four sisters. His family is Jewish.

Ephron died in 1992 of "natural causes" at the Motion Picture Hospital in Los Angeles.

Notable works
(unless otherwise noted, films written with Phoebe Ephron):
 Three Is a Family (1944)
 Bride by Mistake (1944)
 Belles on Their Toes (1952); sequel to Cheaper by the Dozen
 What Price Glory (1952); Screenplay
 There's No Business Like Show Business (1954)
 Daddy Long Legs (1955); Screenplay
 Carousel (1956); also producer
 Desk Set (1957); also producer
 Take Her, She's Mine (1961); Broadway play, later made into a film, then an unsold ABC TV comedy series with Van Johnson starring in the pilot
 Captain Newman, M.D. (1963), nominated for Oscar, Best Screenplay Based on Material from Another Medium

Autobiography
 We Thought We Could Do Anything (1977)

References

External links
 
 The Oscar Site
 New York Times biography

1911 births
1992 deaths
Film producers from New York (state)
American male screenwriters
American people of Belarusian-Jewish descent
Jewish American dramatists and playwrights
People from the Bronx
20th-century American dramatists and playwrights
American male dramatists and playwrights
20th-century American businesspeople
20th-century American male writers
Ephron family
Screenwriters from New York (state)
20th-century American screenwriters
20th-century American Jews